The Macrocentrinae are a subfamily of braconid parasitic wasps. Several species have been used in biological control programs.

Description and distribution 
Macrocentrines are relatively large braconids, recognizable by the presence of small teeth on the trochantellus. Many have pale coloration and nocturnal habits. They belong to the noncyclostome group.

They are found worldwide.

Biology 
Macrocentrines include solitary and gregarious koinobiont endoparasitoids of caterpillars.

References

External links 
 Photos on BugGuide
 DNA barcodes at BOLD systems

Braconidae
Apocrita subfamilies